Caytonia nathorstii is an extinct species of seed ferns.

Description 
Caytonia has berry like cupules with numerous small seeds arrayed along axes

Whole plant reconstructions 
Different organs attributed to the same original plant can be reconstructed from co-occurrence at the same locality and from similarities in the stomatal apparatus and other anatomical peculiarities of fossilized cuticles. 
Caytonia nathorstii may have been produced by the same plant as Caytonanthus arberi (pollen organs) and Sagenopteris phillipsii (leaves).

References 

Fossil record of plants
Jurassic plants
Pteridospermatophyta